The Workhouse, also known as Greet House, in the town of Southwell, Nottinghamshire, England, is a museum operated by the National Trust, opened to the public in 2002. Built in 1824, it was the prototype of the 19th-century workhouse,
and was cited by the Royal Commission on the poor law as the best example among the existing workhouses, before the resulting New Poor Law of 1834 led to the construction of workhouses across the country. It was designed by William Adams Nicholson an architect of Southwell and Lincoln, together with  the Revd. John T. Becher, a pioneer of workhouse and prison reform It is described by the National Trust as the best-preserved workhouse in England.

The building remained in use until the early 1990s, when it was used to provide temporary accommodation for mothers and children. Its acquisition by the National Trust reflects that organisation's wish to broaden its interests and to ensure the continued existence of a Grade II* listed building that was potentially to be turned into residential flats.

Restoration work began with roof repairs in 2000 and is ongoing. Many rooms have been redecorated as they would have looked in the 19th century and buildings, walls and privies, which had been demolished in the 20th century, have been reinstated.

The laundry drying room was opened in March 2012, co-inciding with long-service presentations to staff and volunteers by (then) National Trust director-general, Fiona Reynolds.

In 2013, the site received the Sandford Award for Heritage Education, as a learning-facility for local schoolchildren.

In 2015 the property was featured in 24 Hours in the Past.

References
Notes

Bibliography

External links

The Workhouseand Infirmary, information at the National Trust

BBC Radio 4, 2007/08: Fearnought (poems for Southwell Workhouse)

Grade II* listed buildings in Nottinghamshire
National Trust properties in Nottinghamshire
Workhouses in Nottinghamshire
Museums in Nottinghamshire
History museums in Nottinghamshire
Southwell, Nottinghamshire
Upton, Newark and Sherwood